A headless engine or fixed head engine is an engine where the end of the cylinder is cast as one piece with the cylinder and crankcase. The most well known headless engines are the Fairbanks-Morse Z and the Witte Headless hit and miss engine

See also 

 Monobloc engine

References

Engines